Theodore Corsson Search (1841 – 1920) was a renowned businessman who was the president of the National Association of Manufacturers, founder of Philadelphia University, and managing director of the Stetson Company.

See also
 Searchmont, Ontario
 Searchmont Motor Company

External links
 

American manufacturing businesspeople
1841 births
1920 deaths
University and college founders

19th-century American businesspeople